Bukownica may refer to the following places:
Bukownica, Gostyń County in Greater Poland Voivodeship (west-central Poland)
Bukownica, Ostrzeszów County in Greater Poland Voivodeship (west-central Poland)
Bukownica, Lublin Voivodeship (east Poland)
Bukownica, Kuyavian Pomeranian Voivodeship